James Bruce (La: Jacobus de Brois) (died 1447) was a 15th-century cleric who was bishop of Dunkeld, Chancellor of Scotland, and bishop of Glasgow.

Biography
He was the son of one Robert Bruce, a middling landowner in Clackmannanshire. He was rector of Kilmany (Fife), and Archdeacon of Dunkeld. In 1441, on the death of Alexander de Lawedre, bishop-elect of Dunkeld, James Bruce was elected as bishop. He was consecrated at Dunfermline on 4 February 1442. He celebrated his first festive mass on the feast of St. Adomnán, i.e. 23 September. His rule in Dunkeld came to an end when, on 3 February 1447, he was translated to the bishopric of Glasgow. His time as bishop of Glasgow was, however, short.  He died in Edinburgh in 1447, probably at the end of the summer. He was buried in St Mary's chapel, Dunfermline.

References

Dowden, John, The Bishops of Scotland, ed. J. Maitland Thomson, (Glasgow, 1912)

James
15th-century Scottish Roman Catholic bishops
Bishops of Dunkeld (pre-Reformation)
Bishops of Glasgow
Lord chancellors of Scotland
1447 deaths
Year of birth unknown